Gleason is a 2002 television film directed by Howard Deutch and starring Brad Garrett as Jackie Gleason.

Plot

Cast
Brad Garrett as Jackie Gleason
Saul Rubinek as George "Bullets" Durgom
Gretchen Egolf as Genevieve Halford
Kristen Dalton as Audrey Meadows
Michael Chieffo as Art Carney
Danny Wells as Jack L. Warner
Mark Camacho as Sammy Birch
Jason Blicker as Sol Friedman
Vlasta Vrána as Toots Shor
Shawn Lawrence as William S. Paley
Kevin Dunn as Jack Philbin
Terry Farrell as Marilyn Taylor
Johanna Nutter as Joyce Randolph
Lisa Bronwyn Moore as Pert Kelton

Production
Back in 1997, Garrett was set to portray Gleason in a television biopic for CBS, with the script written by Everybody Loves Raymond creator Philip Rosenthal, but it never came to fruition.

When he learned that CBS acquired the rights to Gleason's life story, Garrett personally lobbied to the network to portray the role.  Initially, CBS offered the part of Gleason to Mark Addy.  However, Addy dropped out due to scheduling conflicts, thus Garrett was officially cast as Gleason.

Garrett reportedly disapproved of the script written by Rick Podell and Michael Preminger.  With assistance from Deutch, Garrett and his writer friend Dave Boone wrote an uncredited rewrite of the script.

Garrett and Deutch paid Greg Cannom with their own money for him to apply for the makeup needed for Garrett to look like Gleason.  It took Garrett three hours to put on the makeup and an hour and a half to take it off.

Unlike Gleason, who was 5 feet 11 in real life, Garrett was 6 feet 8 at the time of filming; in order for Garrett to appear as if he were 5 feet 11, the other cast members wore boots with seven-inch lifts and the doorways on the set were built at 8 feet rather than the usual 6 feet 9.

The film was shot in Montreal.

Accolades
For his performance, Garrett was nominated for both the Primetime Emmy Award for Outstanding Lead Actor in a Limited Series or Movie and the Screen Actors Guild Award for Outstanding Performance by a Male Actor in a Miniseries or Television Movie.  Deutch was nominated for the Directors Guild of America Award for Outstanding Directing – Miniseries or TV Film.

References

External links

 
 

2002 television films
2002 films
2000s English-language films
Films shot in Montreal
Films directed by Howard Deutch
CBS network films
American biographical films
Films set in the 20th century
2000s biographical films
Canadian drama television films
English-language Canadian films
American drama television films
2000s American films
2000s Canadian films